Masatoshi (written: , , , , , , , , , , , ,  or ) is a masculine Japanese given name. Notable people with the name include:

, Japanese politician
, Japanese film director
, Japanese politician
, Japanese comedian
, Japanese samurai
, Japanese daimyō
, Japanese cyclist
, Japanese samurai and daimyō
Masatoshi Ishida (disambiguation), multiple people
, Japanese businessman
, Japanese manga artist
, Japanese physicist
, Japanese footballer
, Japanese politician
, Japanese guitarist
, Japanese footballer
, Japanese footballer
, Japanese footballer
, Japanese diplomat
, Japanese actor
Masatoshi Nagatomi (1926–2000), Japanese professor of Buddhist studies at Harvard University
, Japanese photographer
, Japanese actor and singer
, Japanese karateka
, Japanese scientist
, Japanese physicist
, Japanese singer-songwriter
, Japanese slalom canoeist
, Japanese electronics engineer
, Japanese rower
, Japanese judoka
, Japanese Nordic combined skier
, Japanese biologist
, Japanese sport wrestler
, Japanese manga artist
, Japanese politician
, Japanese physical geographer and climatologist
 a Turkish Mathematician of Japanese ancestry

See also
31671 Masatoshi, a main-belt asteroid

Japanese masculine given names